Charlotte-Rose de Caumont de La Force or Mademoiselle de La Force (1654–1724) was a French novelist and poet. Her best-known work was her 1698 fairy tale Persinette which was adapted by the Brothers Grimm in 1812 as the story Rapunzel.

She was the daughter of François de Caumont de La Force (eighth son of Marshal de La Force), marquis de Castelmoron and of Marguerite de Viçose.  Raised as a Huguenot Protestant, she converted to Catholicism in 1686 and received a pension of 1000 écus from Louis XIV.  Like other famous women writers of the 17th century, she was named a member of the Academy of the Ricovrati of Padua.

Her first novels were in the popular vein of "histoires secrètes", short novels recounting the "secret history" of a famous person and linking the action generally to an amorous intrigue, such as Histoire secrete de Bourgogne (1694),  Histoire secrète de Henri IV, roi de Castille (1695), Histoire de Marguerite de Valois, reine de Navarre (1696).

She had a long affair with the much younger Charles Briou, finally managing to marry him secretly with the king's permission, but her family and his father intervened to have the marriage annulled.

In 1697, due to gossip and scandalous rumors about her, the king forced Mademoiselle de La Force to take to the Benedictine abbey of Gercy-en-Brie or risk losing her pension, and it was from here that she wrote her memoirs: Pensées chrétiennes de défunte de Mlle de La Force.

She is also well known for participating in the 17th century vogue of contes des fées along with Henriette-Julie de Murat, Marie Catherine d'Aulnoy, Marie-Jeanne Lhéritier, and Charles Perrault.  She wrote Les Contes des Contes (1698) and Les Contes des Fées.  These works included the tale Fairer-than-a-Fairy.

Her novels had a great deal of success in Europe in the 18th century.

Mademoiselle de La Force is featured as a main character in Kate Forsyth's Bitter Greens; a fairy-tale retelling of the Rapunzel tale.

Works

Fairy tales
 La Bonne Femme (The Good Woman)
 La Puissance d'Amour
 Le Pays des Délices
 L'Enchanteur (The Enchanter)
 Persinette
 Plus Belle que Fée (Fairer-than-a-Fairy)
 Tourbillon
 Vert et Bleu (Green and Blue)

References

Sources
Dandrey, Patrick, ed. Dictionnaire des lettres françaises: Le XVIIe siècle. Collection: La Pochothèque. Paris: Fayard, 1996.
Les Contes des Contes Premier Tom
Contes Mademoiselle Force

External links
 
 

1654 births
1724 deaths
French children's writers
French women novelists
Collectors of fairy tales
17th-century French women writers
17th-century French writers
17th-century French novelists
French nobility
French women children's writers
Gascony
Women science fiction and fantasy writers
Converts to Roman Catholicism from Calvinism
Women folklorists